Vela X-1 is a pulsing, eclipsing high-mass X-ray binary (HMXB) system, associated with the Uhuru source 4U 0900-40 and the supergiant star HD 77581. 
The X-ray emission of the neutron star is caused by the capture and accretion of matter from the stellar wind of the supergiant companion.  Vela X-1 is the prototypical detached HMXB.

The orbital period of the system is 8.964 days, with the neutron star being eclipsed for about two days of each orbit by HD 77581. It has been given the variable star designation GP Velorum, and it varies from visual magnitude 6.76 to 6.99.
The spin period of the neutron star is about 283 seconds, and gives rise to strong X-ray pulsations. 
The mass of the pulsar is estimated to be at least  solar masses.

Characteristics
Long term monitoring of the spin period shows small random increases and decreases over time similar to a random walk. The accreting matter causes the random spin period changes. However, a recent study has detected nearly periodic spin period reversals in Vela X-1 on long time-scales of about 5.9 years.

See also 
 High-mass X-ray binary
 List of X-ray pulsars
 X-ray binary

References

External links 
 Spin frequency history of Vela X-1
 Long-term spin period evolution of Vela X-1 for about five decades

B-type supergiants
X-ray binaries
Neutron stars
Pulsars
Runaway stars
Vela (constellation)
Durchmusterung objects
077581
044368
Velorum, GP